This is a list of National Trust properties in England, including  any stately home, historic house, castle, abbey, museum or other property in the care of the National Trust in England.

Bedfordshire
Dunstable Downs
Whipsnade Tree Cathedral
Willington Dovecote & Stables

Berkshire
Basildon Park
Cock Marsh
Lardon Chase, the Holies and Lough Down

Bristol
Blaise Hamlet
Westbury College Gatehouse

Buckinghamshire
Ascott House
Ashridge Estate
Boarstall Duck Decoy
Boarstall Tower 
Bradenham Village
Buckingham Chantry Chapel
Claydon House
Cliveden
Coombe Hill
Dorneywood Garden
Hartwell House
Hughenden Manor
The King's Head Inn, Aylesbury
Long Crendon Courthouse
Pitstone Windmill
Princes Risborough Manor House
Stowe Gardens
Waddesdon Manor
West Wycombe Park
West Wycombe Village

Cambridgeshire
Anglesey Abbey, Garden & Lode Mill
Houghton Mill
Peckover House & Garden
Ramsey Abbey Gatehouse
Wicken Fen
Wimpole Hall
Wimpole Home Farm

Cheshire
Alderley Edge
Helsby Hill
Hare Hill
Little Moreton Hall
Lyme Park
Nether Alderley Mill
Quarry Bank Mill and Styal Estate
Tatton Park
Dunham Massey

Cornwall
Antony House
Boscastle
Carnewas & Bedruthan Steps
Cornish Mines & Engines
Cotehele
Glendurgan Garden
Godolphin Estate
Godrevy
Hawker's Hut
Lanhydrock House
Lawrence House
Levant Mine & Beam Engine
St Anthony Head
St Michael's Mount
Tintagel Old Post Office
Trelissick Garden
Trengwainton Garden
Trerice

Cumbria
Acorn Bank Garden & Watermill
Aira Force
Allan Bank
Beatrix Potter Gallery
Borrowdale
Bowder Stone
Buttermere and Ennerdale
Cartmel Priory Gatehouse
Cross Keys Inn, Sedbergh
Dalton Castle
Derwent Island House
Fell Foot Park
Gondola, Coniston Water
Grasmere and Great Langdale
Hawkshead and Claife
Hill Top
Keld Chapel, Shap
Old Dungeon Ghyll
Sizergh Castle & Garden
Stagshaw Garden
Tarn Hows
Townend
Ullswater
Wasdale, Eskdale and Duddon
Windermere and Troutbeck
Wordsworth House
Wray Castle

Derbyshire
Calke Abbey
Duffield Castle
Hardwick Hall
High Peak Estate
Ilam Park
Kedleston Hall
Longshaw Estate
Stainsby Mill
Sudbury Hall
The Old Manor
White Peak Estate
Winster Market House

Devon
A La Ronde
Arlington Court
Bolberry Down
Bradley
Branscombe — The Old Bakery, Manor Mill & Forge
Buckland Abbey
Castle Drogo
The Church House
Coleton Fishacre
Compton Castle
Finch Foundry
Greenway
Heddon Valley Shop
Killerton
Knightshayes Court
Loughwood Meeting House
Lundy
Lydford Gorge
Morte Point
The Old Mill, Wembury
Overbeck's
Parke
Saltram
Shute Barton
Watersmeet House

Dorset
Ballard Down
Brownsea Island
Cerne Giant
Clouds Hill
Corfe Castle
Eggardon Hill
Hambledon Hill
Hardy Monument
Hardy's Cottage
Hod Hill
Kingston Lacy
Lambert's Castle
Lewesdon Hill
Max Gate
Old Harry Rocks
Pilsdon Pen
Portland House
Studland Beach
White Mill

Essex
Bourne Mill (Essex)
Coggeshall Grange Barn
Danbury Commons and Blakes Wood
Hatfield Forest
Northey Island
Paycocke's
Ray Island
Rayleigh Mount

Gloucestershire
Ashleworth Tithe Barn
Bibury 
Chedworth Roman Villa
Dyrham Park
Hailes Abbey
Haresfield Beacon and Standish Wood
Hidcote Manor Garden
Horton Court
Little Fleece Bookshop
Lodge Park and Sherborne Estate
Part of May Hill
Newark Park
Snowshill Manor
Westbury Court Garden
Woodchester Park

Greater Manchester
Dunham Massey

Hampshire
Hinton Ampner
Mottisfont Abbey
Sandham Memorial Chapel
The Vyne
West Green House
Winchester City Mill

Herefordshire
Berrington Hall
Croft Castle
Cwmmau Farmhouse
Brockhampton Estate
The Weir Garden

Hertfordshire
Ashridge Estate
Shaw's Corner

Isle of Wight
Bembridge Fort
Bembridge Windmill
Brighstone Shop
Mottistone Manor
The Needles Batteries
Newtown Old Town Hall
St. Catherine's Oratory
Rosetta Cottage

Kent
Chartwell
Chiddingstone
Cobham Wood and Mausoleum
Emmetts Garden
Ightham Mote
Knole
Old Soar Manor
Owletts
Quebec House
Scotney Castle
Sissinghurst Castle Garden
Smallhythe Place
South Foreland Lighthouse
Sprivers Garden
St. John's Jerusalem
Stoneacre
The White Cliffs of Dover

Lancashire
Gawthorpe Hall
Rufford Old Hall
Heysham Head

Leicestershire
Stoneywell
Staunton Harold Church
Ulverscroft Nature Reserve

Lincolnshire
Belton House
Grantham House
Gunby Hall and Monksthorpe chapel
Tattershall Castle near Sleaford
Woolsthorpe Manor

Greater London
2 Willow Road
Blewcoat School
Carlyle's House
Eastbury Manor House
East Sheen Common
Fenton House
George Inn
Ham House
Lindsey House
Morden Hall Park
Osterley Park
Petts Wood & Hawkwood
Red House
Rainham Hall
Roman Baths, Strand Lane
Selsdon Wood
Sutton House
Watermeads

Merseyside
Formby
Speke Hall
20 Forthlin Road
251 Menlove Avenue
59 Rodney Street

Norfolk
Blakeney Point
Blickling Hall
Brancaster
Elizabethan House Museum, Great Yarmouth
Felbrigg Hall
Horsey Windpump
Oxburgh Hall
Sheringham Park
St. George's Guildhall, King's Lynn

Northamptonshire
Canons Ashby House
Lyveden New Bield
Priest's House, Easton on the Hill

Northumberland
Allen Banks & Staward Gorge
Cherryburn
Cragside
Dunstanburgh Castle
Farne Islands
George Stephenson's Birthplace
Hadrian's Wall and Housesteads Roman Fort
Lindisfarne Castle
25.75 km (16 miles) of the Northumberland Coast
Ros Castle
St Cuthbert's Cave
Seaton Delaval Hall
Wallington Hall

Nottinghamshire
Clumber Park
Mr. Straw's House
The Workhouse, Southwell

Oxfordshire
Ashdown House
Buscot Park
Chastleton House
Great Coxwell Barn
Greys Court
Lock Cottage, Buscot
Nuffield Place
Priory Cottages

Shropshire
Attingham Park near Shrewsbury
Benthall Hall near Ironbridge
Carding Mill Valley near Church Stretton
Cronkhill near Shrewsbury
Dudmaston Hall near Bridgnorth
Morville Hall near Bridgnorth
Sunnycroft at Wellington
Town Walls Tower Shrewsbury
Wilderhope Manor on Wenlock Edge

Somerset

Barrington Court
Bath Assembly Rooms
Burrow Mump
Brean Down
Brean Down Fort
Cadbury Camp
Cheddar Gorge
Clevedon Court
Coleridge Cottage
Crook Peak to Shute Shelve Hill
Dolebury Warren
Dunster Castle
Dunster Working Watermill
Ebbor Gorge
Fyne Court
Glastonbury Tor
Holnicote Estate
King Alfred's Tower
King John's Hunting Lodge
Leigh Woods
Lytes Cary Manor
Montacute House
The Priest's House, Muchelney
Prior Park Landscape Garden
Sand Point
Solsbury Hill
Stembridge Tower Mill
Stoke sub Hamdon Priory
Tintinhull Garden
Treasurer's House
Tyntesfield
Walton and Ivythorn Hills
West Pennard Court Barn
Yarn Market, Dunster

Staffordshire
Biddulph Grange
Downs Banks
Ilam Hall
Kinver Edge
Letocetum
Mow Cop Castle
Moseley Old Hall
South Peak Estate
Shugborough Hall

Suffolk
Angel Corner, Bury St Edmunds
Bridge Cottage, Flatford
Dunwich Heath
Ickworth House
Lavenham: The Guildhall Of Corpus Christi
Melford Hall
Orford Ness
Theatre Royal, Bury St Edmunds
Sutton Hoo
Thorington Hall

Surrey
Abinger Roughs and Netley Park, Abinger Hammer/Wotton
Box Hill
Clandon House (Largely destroyed by fire)
Claremont Landscape Garden
Dapdune Wharf
Hatchlands Park
Hindhead Common
The Homewood
Hydon's Ball
Leith Hill
Oakhurst Cottage
Polesden Lacey
River Wey and Godalming Navigations
Runnymede
Shalford Mill
Winkworth Arboretum
The Witley Centre

East Sussex
Alfriston Clergy House
Bateman's
Birling Gap
Bodiam Castle
Lamb House
Monk's House
Sheffield Park and Garden
Litlington White Horse

West Sussex
Cissbury Ring
Harting Down
Nymans
Petworth House
Standen
Uppark
Wakehurst Place Garden
Woolbeding Gardens

Teesside
Ormesby Hall

Tyne and Wear
Gibside
Penshaw Monument
Souter Lighthouse
Washington Old Hall

Warwickshire
Baddesley Clinton
Charlecote Park
Coughton Court
Farnborough Hall
Kinwarton Dovecote
Packwood House
Upton House

West Midlands
Birmingham Back to Backs
Roundhouse, Birmingham
Wightwick Manor

Wiltshire
Avebury
Avebury Manor & Garden
The Courts Garden
Figsbury Ring
Great Chalfield Manor
Heelis
Lacock Abbey, Fox Talbot Museum
Little Clarendon, Dinton
Mompesson House
Pepperbox Hill
Philipps House and Dinton Park
Stonehenge Landscape (formerly Stonehenge Down and Stonehenge Historic Landscape)
Stourhead
Westwood Manor
White Barrow

Worcestershire
Bredon Barn
Croome Park
The Firs (Elgar Birthplace Museum)
The Fleece Inn
The Greyfriars
Hanbury Hall
Hawford Dovecote
Knowles Mill, Bewdley
Middle Littleton Tythe Barn
Rosedene, Chartist cottage
Wichenford Dovecote

East Riding of Yorkshire
Maister House, Hull

North Yorkshire
Beningbrough Hall and gardens
Braithwaite Hall
Bridestones, Crosscliff and Blakey Topping
Brimham Rocks
Fountains Abbey and Studley Royal Water Garden
Goddards House and Garden
Malham Tarn Estate
Middlethorpe Hall
Moulton Hall
Nunnington Hall
Rievaulx Terrace & Temples
Robin Hood's Bay, Old Coastguard Station
Roseberry Topping
Treasurer's House
Upper Wharfedale
Yorkshire Coast

South Yorkshire
Wentworth Castle Gardens
Wentworth Woodhouse

West Yorkshire
East Riddlesden Hall
Hardcastle Crags
Longshaw Estate
Marsden Moor Estate
Nostell Priory

See also
List of National Trust properties in Wales
List of National Trust properties in Northern Ireland
List of National Trust for Scotland properties
List of historic houses
List of abbeys and priories
List of castles
List of museums
List of Conservation topics
List of National Trust land in England
 List of English Heritage properties

External links
 The National Trust

National Trust properties in England
National Trust properties in England

National Trust properties in England
National Trust properties in England
National Trust properties